Tmesisternus gracilis is a species of beetle in the family Cerambycidae. It was described by Gressitt in 1984. It is known from Papua New Guinea.

References

gracilis
Beetles described in 1984